Bernardo Falcone (born  in Bissone; died ) was an Italian-Swiss sculptor of the Early Baroque.

Life 
Bernardo Falcone was born to Domenico Falcone from Rovio and Lucia Grighi from Venice. He lived in Bissone, as evidenced by an inventory of his estates from 1676 and 1677. He worked as a sculptor mainly in Venice and left numerous statues in its churches and schools among which are the churches of Santi Giovanni e Paolo, Santa Maria Gloriosa dei Frari, San Zanipolo, and the Scalzi.

In Parma he worked on the statuary of Saint John the Evangelist. In 1682, he worked on four statues for the basilica of Santa Giustina in Padua and in 1694 on the colossal statue of Saint Charles Borromeo in Arona. Various works in the churches of Rovigo are also attributed to him

References

Citations

Sources 
 
 
 

1620 births
1696 deaths
17th-century Italian sculptors
17th-century Swiss artists
Baroque sculptors